The Crazy Horse Memorial is a mountain monument under construction on privately held land in the Black Hills, in Custer County, South Dakota, United States. It will depict the Oglala Lakota warrior Crazy Horse, riding a horse and pointing to his tribal land. The memorial was commissioned by Henry Standing Bear, a Lakota elder, to be sculpted by Korczak Ziolkowski. It is operated by the Crazy Horse Memorial Foundation, a nonprofit organization.

The monument has been in progress since 1948 and is far from completion. If completed as designed, it will become the world's second tallest statue, after the Statue of Unity in India.

Overview
The memorial master plan includes the mountain carving monument, a Native American Museum of North America, and a Native American Cultural Center.

Crazy Horse

Crazy Horse was a Native American war leader of the Oglala Lakota. He took up arms against the U.S. Federal government to fight against encroachments on the territories and way of life of the Lakota people. His most famous actions against the U.S. military included the Fetterman Fight (21 December 1866) and the Battle of the Little Bighorn (25–26 June 1876). He surrendered to U.S. troops under General George Crook in May 1877 and was fatally wounded by a military guard, allegedly while resisting imprisonment at Camp Robinson in present-day Nebraska. He ranks among the most notable and iconic of Native American tribal members and was honored by the U.S. Postal Service in 1982 with a 13¢ postage stamp that is part of its Great Americans series.

History of the monument
Henry Standing Bear ("Mato Naji"), an Oglala Lakota chief, and well-known statesman and elder in the Native American community, recruited and commissioned Polish-American sculptor Korczak Ziolkowski to build the Crazy Horse Memorial in the Black Hills of South Dakota. In October 1931, Luther Standing Bear, Henry's older brother, wrote to sculptor Gutzon Borglum, who was carving the heads of four American presidents at Mount Rushmore. Luther suggested that it would be "most fitting to have the face of Crazy Horse sculpted there. Crazy Horse is the real patriot of the Sioux tribe and the only one worthy to place by the side of Washington and Lincoln." Borglum never replied. Thereafter, Henry Standing Bear began a campaign to have Borglum carve an image of Crazy Horse on Mount Rushmore. In summer of 1935, Standing Bear, frustrated over the stalled Crazy Horse project, wrote to James H. Cook, a long time friend of Chief Red Cloud's, "I am struggling hopelessly with this because I am without funds, no employment and no assistance from any Indian or White."

On November 7, 1939, Henry Standing Bear wrote to the Polish-American sculptor Korczak Ziolkowski, who worked on Mount Rushmore under Gutzon Borglum. He informed the sculptor, "My fellow chiefs and I would like the white man to know that the red man has great heroes, too." Standing Bear also wrote a letter to Undersecretary Oscar Chapman of the Department of the Interior, offering all his own fertile 900 acres (365 ha) in exchange for the barren mountain for the purpose of paying honor to Crazy Horse. The government responded positively, and the U.S. Forest Service, responsible for the land, agreed to grant a permit for the use of the land, with a commission to oversee the project. Standing Bear chose not to seek government funds and relied instead upon influential Americans interested in the welfare of the American Indian to privately fund the project.

In the spring of 1940, Ziolkowski spent three weeks with Standing Bear at Pine Ridge, South Dakota, discussing land ownership issues and learning about Crazy Horse and the Lakota way of life. According to Ziolkowski, "Standing Bear grew very angry when he spoke of the broken Treaty of Fort Laramie (1868). That was the one I'd read about in which the President promised the Black Hills would belong to the Indians forever. I remember how his old eyes flashed out of that dark mahogany face, then he would shake his head and fall silent for a long while."

Memorial foundation
The memorial is a non-profit undertaking, and does not accept federal or state funding. The Memorial Foundation finances the project by charging fees for its visitor centers, earning revenue from its gift shops and receiving private contributions. Ziolkowski reportedly was offered 10 million for the project from the federal government on two occasions, but he turned the offers down. He felt the project was more than just a mountain carving, and he feared that his plans for the broader educational and cultural goals of the memorial would be overturned by federal involvement.

After Ziolkowski died in 1982 at age 74, his widow Ruth Ziolkowski, took charge of the sculpture, overseeing work on the project as CEO from the 1980s to the 2010s. Ruth Ziolkowski decided to focus on the completion of Crazy Horse's face first, instead of the horse as her husband had originally planned. She believed that Crazy Horse's face, once completed, would increase the sculpture's draw as a tourist attraction, which would provide additional funding. She also oversaw the staff, which included seven of her children.

Ruth Ziolkowski and seven of the Ziolkowskis' 10 children carried on work at the memorial. Daughter Monique Ziolkowski, herself a sculptor, modified some of her father's plans to ensure that the weight of the outstretched arm was supported sufficiently. The foundation commissioned reports from two engineering firms in 2009 to help guide completion of the project. Work commenced on the horse after two years of careful planning and measurements. Since the completion of the head and face, much of the monument's sculpting work has been dedicated to the much larger horse portion.

Ruth Ziolkowski died on May 21, 2014, at the age of 87. Monique Ziolkowski became CEO and three of her siblings continue to work on the project, as well as three of the Ziolkowskis' grandsons.

Anticipated completion date
At the time construction started in 1948, the artist estimated the work would be complete in 30 years.  As of 2022, there was no timeline for when the monument would be completed; however, the hand, arm, shoulder, hairline, and top of the horse's head were anticipated to be finished by 2037.

Completed vision

The memorial is to be the centerpiece of an educational/cultural center, to include a satellite campus of the University of South Dakota, with a classroom building and residence hall, made possible by a 2.5 million donation in 2007 from T. Denny Sanford, a philanthropist from Sioux Falls, South Dakota. It is called the Indian University of North America and the Indian Museum of North America. The current visitor complex will anchor the center. Sanford also donated 5 million to the memorial, to be paid 1 million a year for five years as matching donations were raised, specifically to further work on the horse's head.

Paul and Donna "Muffy" Christen of Huron, South Dakota, in July 2010, announced they were donating 5 million in two installments to an endowment to support the operation of the satellite campus. It holds classes in math, English, and American Indian studies courses for college credit, as well as outreach classes. The memorial foundation has awarded more than 1.2 million in scholarships, with the majority going to Native students within South Dakota.

Fundraising and events
The Memorial foundation began its first national fund drive in October 2006. The goal was to raise 16.5 million by 2011. The first planned project was a 1.4 million dormitory to house 40 American Indian students who would work as interns at the memorial.

Opposition
Crazy Horse resisted being photographed and was deliberately buried where his grave would not be found. Ziolkowski envisioned the monument as a metaphoric tribute to the spirit of Crazy Horse and Native Americans. He reportedly said, "My lands are where my dead lie buried." His extended hand on the monument is to symbolize that statement.

Elaine Quiver, a descendant of one of Crazy Horse's aunts, said in 2003 that the elder Standing Bear should not have independently petitioned Ziolkowski to create the memorial, because Lakota culture dictates consensus from family members for such a decision, which was not obtained before the first rock was dynamited in 1948. She said:

They don't respect our culture because we didn't give permission for someone to carve the sacred Black Hills where our burial grounds are. They were there for us to enjoy and they were there for us to pray. But it wasn't meant to be carved into images, which is very wrong for all of us. The more I think about it, the more it's a desecration of our Indian culture. Not just Crazy Horse, but all of us.

Seth Big Crow, whose great-grandmother was an aunt of Crazy Horse's, said he wondered about the millions of dollars which the Ziolkowski family had collected from the visitor center and shops associated with the memorial, and "the amount of money being generated by his ancestor's name". He said:

Or did it give them free hand to try to take over the name and make money off it as long as they're alive and we're alive? When you start making money rather than to try to complete the project, that's when, to me, it's going off in the wrong direction.

Other traditional Lakota oppose the memorial. In his 1972 autobiography, John Fire Lame Deer, a Lakota medicine man, said: "The whole idea of making a beautiful wild mountain into a statue of him is a pollution of the landscape. It is against the spirit of Crazy Horse." In a 2001 interview, Lakota activist Russell Means said: "Imagine going to the holy land in Israel, whether you're a Christian or a Jew or a Muslim, and start carving up the mountain of Zion. It's an insult to our entire being. It's bad enough getting four white faces carved in up there, the shrine of hypocrisy."

In his 2019 New Yorker article, ‘Who Speaks for Crazy Horse?’, author Brooke Jarvis states: “On Pine Ridge and in Rapid City, I heard a number of Lakota say that the memorial has become a tribute not to Crazy Horse but to Ziolkowski and his family”.

See also

 List of colossal sculpture in situ
 List of tallest statues
 List of the tallest statues in the United States

References

External links

  of the Crazy Horse Memorial Foundation
  at the official website

1948 establishments in South Dakota
Biographical museums in South Dakota
Black Hills
Buildings and structures under construction in the United States
Colossal statues in the United States
Equestrian statues in South Dakota
Geography of Custer County, South Dakota
Great Sioux War of 1876
Lakota
Monuments and memorials in South Dakota
Mountain monuments and memorials
Museums in Custer County, South Dakota
Native American museums in South Dakota
Sculptures of Native Americans
Outdoor sculptures in South Dakota
Statues in South Dakota
Cultural depictions of Crazy Horse
Statues of military officers
Unfinished sculptures